The Colorado Alliance of Research Libraries is an association of a number of libraries in Colorado and Wyoming.

Purpose

The Colorado Alliance of Research Libraries was established in 1974. One major purpose of the Alliance is to share resources and provide the best terms and price to its members by group purchasing. Projects of the Alliance over the years include:

 Prospector, a unified catalog of academic, public, and other libraries in Colorado and Wyoming (current)
 Gold Rush, a database of online article resources (fulltext journals and abstracts) and access options (current)
 Alliance Digital Repository, a consortial repository service supporting the preservation of, management of, and access to digital content (current)
 CARL and UnCover (historical)

Prospector also provides a faster and more convenient mechanism for interlibrary loans from member libraries, which can be ordered by patrons directly from the catalog.

CARL and UnCover

CARL started as a character-based access system to resources, in particular catalogs of participating libraries as they were being computerized, available via dialup long before the advent of World Wide Web. The CARL system eventually included a subset of Dialog. The flagship CARL product was UnCover, an article index database. UnCover provides free article search and access to the article text for a fee.
CARL was spun off in 1988 into a for-profit company, later owned by Knight-Ridder and then Dialog before becoming briefly Uncover, Inc. In 2000, UnCover has been acquired by Ingenta and is now accessible as a part of Ingentaconnect.

Member libraries
These libraries are members of the Alliance:

References

External links

Bibliographic database providers
Cooperatives in the United States
1974 establishments in Colorado
Library consortia in Colorado
Library consortia in Wyoming
Library consortia with members in multiple states